Georgios Balogiannis (alternate spelling: Giorgos, Ballogianis, Mpalogiannis) (born January 17, 1971, in Thessaloniki, Greece) is a retired Greek professional basketball player.

Professional career
Balogiannis played for VAO from 1988 to 1992. In 1993, he moved to PAOK. Balogiannis won the Korać Cup in 1994, and 2 Greek Cups.

In 2000, Balogiannis moved to Panathinaikos, and with them he won 2 Greek League championships (2001, 2003) and 1 Greek Cup (2003). He also played in the FIBA SuproLeague Final in 2001.

In the 2003–04 season, Balogiannis played with Makedonikos, and the next year he returned to PAOK, to play one more year.

National team career
Balogiannis was a member of the senior men's Greek national basketball team that finished in 4th place at the 1998 FIBA World Championship. He also played at EuroBasket 1999.

External links 
FIBA.com Profile
Eurobasket.com Profile
Hellenic Federation Profile 

1971 births
Living people
Greek men's basketball players
Makedonikos B.C. players
P.A.O.K. BC players
Panathinaikos B.C. players
Basketball players from Thessaloniki
Shooting guards
VAO B.C. players
1998 FIBA World Championship players